Platycodon grandiflorus (from Ancient Greek  "wide" and  "bell") is a species of herbaceous flowering perennial plant of the family Campanulaceae, and the only member of the genus Platycodon. It is native to East Asia (China, Korea, Japan, and the Russian Far East). It is commonly known as balloon flower (referring to the balloon-shaped flower buds), Chinese bellflower, or platycodon.

Description 
A notable feature of the plant is the flower bud, which swells like a balloon before fully opening. The five petals are fused together into a bell shape at the base, like its relatives, the campanulas.

Ecology

Platycodon grandiflorus is a perennial plant which is commonly grown in mountains and fields. It is 40 to 100 centimeters high and has thick roots, and white juice comes out when the stem is cut. Leaves are 5 to 12 centimeters long, with narrow ends and teeth on the edges.

Flowers bloom purple or white in July and August, with one or several running upward at the end of the circle. The flower crown is divided into five branches in the shape of an open bell.

It lives throughout Japan, China, and eastern Siberia, including the Korean Peninsula.

Cultivation

It dies down completely in winter, reappearing in late spring and flowering in summer. However, plants are widely available from nurseries in full flower from April onwards.

Though the species has blue flowers, there are varieties with white, pink, and purple blooms. In Korea, white flowers are more common. This plant, together with its cultivars 'Apoyama group' and 'Mariesii', have gained the Royal Horticultural Society's Award of Garden Merit.

Uses

Culinary

Korea 
The root, fresh or dried, is one of the most common  vegetables. It is also one of the most frequent ingredients in bibimbap. Sometimes, rice is cooked with balloon flower root to make . Preparation of the root always involves soaking and washing (usually rubbing it with coarse sea salt and rinsing it multiple times), which gets rid of the bitter taste.

Syrup made from the root, called  (balloon flower root honey), can be used to make  (balloon flower root tea). The root can be used to infuse liquor called , typically using distilled soju or other unflavored hard alcohol that has an ABV higher than 30% as a base.

In addition, other ingredients include calcium, fiber, iron, minerals, proteins and vitamins. Bottlenose is a good product for its thick roots, faithful interior, and strong taste.

Medicinal 

The extracts and purified platycoside compounds (saponins) from the roots of Platycodon grandiflorum may exhibit neuroprotective, antimicrobial, anti-inflammatory, anti-cancer, anti-allergy, improved insulin resistance, and cholesterol-lowering properties. Evidence for these potential effects was mainly observed in vitro, with the exception of cholesterol lowering effects documented in vitro and in rats. The lack of efficacy and limited safety data in humans, however, necessitate further research.

China 
The Chinese bellflower (called  in Chinese) is also used in traditional Chinese medicine.

In China, they are used as a cough suppressant and expectorant for common colds, cough, sore throat, tonsillitis, and chest congestion.

Korea 
In Korea, the roots are commonly used for treating bronchitis, asthma, tuberculosis, diabetes, and other inflammatory diseases.

Cultural

Japan 
The bellflower is called  in Japanese. Traditionally, it is one of the Seven Autumn Flowers.

Korea 

 is one of the most popular folk songs in both North and South Korea, and in China among the ethnic Koreans. It is also a well known song in Japan, by the name .

It is a folk song originated from Eunyul in Hwanghae Province. However, the currently sung version is classified as a Gyeonggi minyo (Gyeonggi Province folk song), as the rhythm and the melody have changed to acquire those characteristics.

References

External links

 Platycodon grandiflorus at Robsplants
 

Campanuloideae
Flora of China
Flora of Eastern Asia
Flora of Siberia
Garden plants of Asia
Korean vegetables
Medicinal plants
Monotypic Campanulaceae genera